Sir Ivan Bede Jose (13 February 1893 in Ningbo, China – 23 November 1969 in North Adelaide, South Australia, Australia) was a Chinese-born Australian surgeon, president of Royal Australasian College of Surgeons in 1955–1957 and chairman of the Australian Red Cross Society in 1966–1968

Family
His father was George Jose and brother to Wilfrid (commonly misspelled Wilfred) Jose, a soldier, and Gilbert Jose, a cricketer and soldier. He also has a son, Robert Jose, who lived in North Adelaide, South Australia, until he died in 2020.

References

1893 births
1969 deaths
Australian surgeons
20th-century surgeons
Chinese emigrants to Australia